Danzell Ivan Lee (born March 16, 1963) is a former American football tight end who played two seasons in the National Football League with the Pittsburgh Steelers and Atlanta Falcons. He was drafted by the Washington Redskins in the seventh round of the 1985 NFL Draft. He played college football at Lamar University and attended Corsicana High School in Corsicana, Texas.

References

External links
Just Sports Stats

Living people
1963 births
Players of American football from Texas
American football tight ends
African-American players of American football
Lamar Cardinals football players
Pittsburgh Steelers players
Atlanta Falcons players
People from Corsicana, Texas
National Football League replacement players
21st-century African-American people
20th-century African-American sportspeople